Cave Gully is a seasonal river in Saint Ann Parish, Jamaica.

It flows north from just below the  contour line to meet the Caribbean Sea at Sandy Bay, a small cove.

References

Rivers of Jamaica